Redfearn is a surname. Notable people with the surname include:

Alan Redfearn, English rugby league footballer who played in the 1970s and 1980s
Alec K. Redfearn, musician and composer based out of Providence, Rhode Island
Brian Redfearn, former professional footballer
David Redfearn, English rugby league footballer who played in the 1970s and 1980s
Joseph Redfearn, first class cricketer who played one match for Yorkshire County Cricket Club in 1890 against Surrey CCC
Neil Redfearn (born 1965), English footballer and manager
Paul Leslie Redfearn (1926–2018), American professor of botany and mayor of Springfield, Missouri

See also
Redfearn v Serco Ltd EWCA Civ 659, a UK labour law case concerning a race discrimination case under the Race Relations Act 1976
Transverse Mercator: Redfearn series the basis of the Ordnance Survey National Grid